Pamir Kyrgyz is a dialect of the Kyrgyz language natively spoken in the Chitral district and Gojal Valley of Pakistan and Wakhan Corridor of Afghanistan.  It has been evolving into a distinct dialect of Kyrgyz due to its isolation.  The dialect is known by its speakers as Black Kyrgyz.

Loanwords 
Pamir Kyrgyz uses many loanwords from Dari, which unlike Kyrgyz from Kyrgyzstan, makes it hard to understand the language due to Kyrgyz from Kyrgyzstan using Russian loanwords.

Literacy 
Literacy rate from the Kyrgyz of Pamir has increased, with many proposing an alphabet for it.  The Agha Khan has started funding schools for the Pamir Kyrgyz in Afghanistan for Dari, Pashto, and their native Pamir Kyrgyz language.

Phonology 
The Pamiri Kyrgyz dialect uses long and hard vowels unlike the Kyrgyz in Kyrgyzstan.

Vowels

Consonants

References 

Dialects
Dialects by location
Kyrgyz language
Languages of Pakistan
Languages of Afghanistan